Arcesilaus (fl. 3rd century) was a Roman senator who was appointed consul in AD 267.

Biography
Possibly of Greek descent, Arcesilaus was probably the grandson of Titus Flavius Arcesilaus, who was a Flamen of the Arval Brethren, and who served as the magister creatus throughout the 220s. Arcesilaus himself was probably the Comes of Rome and Italia in AD 257. He was later made consul posterior alongside Ovinius Paternus in AD 267.

Sources
 Christol, Michel, Essai sur l'évolution des carrières sénatoriales dans la seconde moitié du IIIe siècle ap. J.C. (1986)
 Martindale, J. R.; Jones, A. H. M, The Prosopography of the Later Roman Empire, Vol. I AD 260–395, Cambridge University Press (1971)

References

3rd-century Romans
Imperial Roman consuls
Late Roman Empire political office-holders
Year of birth unknown
Year of death unknown